Habibabad (also Romanized as Ḩabībābād; also known as Dasīm and Desīm) is a village in Shahid Modarres Rural District, in the Central District of Shushtar County, Khuzestan Province, Iran. At the 2006 census, its population was 64, in 8 families.

References 

Populated places in Shushtar County